Egernia roomi is a species of skink, a lizard in the family Scincidae.

The species is endemic to New South Wales.

References

Skinks of Australia
roomi
Endemic fauna of Australia
Reptiles described in 1985
Taxa named by Richard Walter Wells
Taxa named by Cliff Ross Wellington